Novosedly nad Nežárkou is a municipality and village in Jindřichův Hradec District in the South Bohemian Region of the Czech Republic. It has about 700 inhabitants.

Administrative parts
Villages of Kolence and Mláka are administrative parts of Novosedly nad Nežárkou.

Twin towns – sister cities

Novosedly nad Nežárkou is twinned with:
 Trub, Switzerland

References

Villages in Jindřichův Hradec District